KJJQ's transmitter is located in the town of Volga, South Dakota, but the studios are in the nearby city of Brookings. Known as The Ranch AM 910, the station has a broad range transmitting across eastern South Dakota and western Minnesota, reaching the cities of Yankton, South Dakota, Webster, South Dakota, Chamberlain, South Dakota, Marshall, Minnesota, Olivia, Minnesota, and the communities between these points. The station was formerly in a historic train depot and went by the name Depot Radio. In 2005, the depot was sold and KJJQ relocated to the building now housing the other four commercial radio stations in Brookings.

Format
KJJQ/“The Ranch AM 910”. The Ranch has carved a unique approach, blending news, sports and ag Information with proven country music---just the right mix of news and information which is pertinent to not only ag producers, but also a broad based audience, Including updates from the Brownfield Network and NAFB member Susan Littlefield. They also feature the locally originating “Sports Show”, weekdays from 9-11am, focusing on all local/regional sports with guests, special features, and some “on-location” broadcasts. The Ranch/KJJQ is also the home of South Dakota State University Jackrabbit Athletics.

External links
KJJQ Website

JJQ
Brookings County, South Dakota
Alpha Media radio stations
1981 establishments in South Dakota
Radio stations established in 1981
Country radio stations in the United States